San Javier Department is a  department of Córdoba Province in Argentina.

The provincial subdivision has a population of about 48,951 inhabitants in an area of 1,652 km², and its capital city is Villa Dolores.

Settlements
Conlara
La Paz
La Población
Las Tapias
Los Cerrillos
Los Hornillos
Luyaba
San Javier/Yacanto
San José
Villa de Las Rosas
Villa Dolores

Departments of Córdoba Province, Argentina